The 1st District of the Iowa House of Representatives in the state of Iowa.

Current elected officials
John Wills is the representative currently representing the district.

Past representatives
The district has previously been represented by:
 Elmer Den Herder, 1971–1973
 Elmer H. Den Herder, 1973–1979
 Kenneth R. De Groot, 1979–1983
 James D. O'Kane, 1983–1987
 Steven D. Hansen, 1987–1995
 Ronald Nutt, 1995–1997
 Wes Whitead, 1997–2001
 Gregory Hoversten, 2001–2003
 Wes Whitead, 2003–2011
 Jeremy Taylor, 2011–2013
 Jeff Smith, 2013–2015
 John Wills, 2015–present

References

001